Sticky catchfly is a common name for several plants and may refer to:

Silene caroliniana, native to eastern North America
, native to Korea
Silene nuda, native to California, Oregon and Nevada in North America
Viscaria vulgaris, native to Europe